Erica Rivinoja is an American film and television writer.

She was nominated for the Academy Award for Best Adapted Screenplay for co-writing Borat Subsequent Moviefilm. Her other film screenplays include Extreme Movie and Cloudy with a Chance of Meatballs 2, and story credits on Trolls, Girls Trip, and The Addams Family.

From 2001 to 2012, Rivinoja was a writer and consultant on the animated comedy series South Park, which earned her two Primetime Emmy Awards for Outstanding Animated Program from four nominations. In July 2020, Rivinoja was announced as the showrunner of the upcoming Clone High revival.

Rivinoja is a native of Hobbs, New Mexico. She graduated from Hobbs High School in 1995.

References

External links

Living people
Primetime Emmy Award winners
American television writers
American women screenwriters
Screenwriters from New Mexico
21st-century American screenwriters
Year of birth missing (living people)
Place of birth missing (living people)